Robert Roelofsen (born 26 March 1970 in the Netherlands) is a Dutch football manager.

References

Dutch football managers
Living people
1970 births